Werner Theunissen (12 May 1942 – 18 January 2010) was a Dutch composer and lyricist of the 70s Dutch country music band "Pussycat". He rose to fame when his song "Mississippi", released by the band in 1975, became an international hit and sold an estimated 7 million copies worldwide.

Musical career 

He began his musical career in the early sixties with 'The Rocking Apaches'. However, it was with the Indo – rock band from Heerlen called 'The Entertainers' that he wrote his first single.  He also gave guitar lessons to three sisters Toni (later Toni Willé lead singer of Pussycat), Marianne and Betty Kowalczyk from Limburg who were around 10, 11 and 12 years old at that time.  Werner got them acquainted with contemporary pop music. He discovered their talent and went on to write his first song for them called 'Bitte, Bitte, Liebe Mich'. Six years later in 1973 he formed the group 'Sweet Reaction' with the core of the group consisting of these three singing sisters, Lou Willé the guitarist from another band called Ricky Rendall and His Centurions along with two other musicians from a band called Scum. Recording came quickly to the nascent group. Within the same year as 'Sweet Reaction' they cut a single, "Tell Alain,"  for the Telstar label owned by Johnny Hoes which did not yield much success. But very soon with the next single and a string of well written and composed songs by Werner, this group was on its way to make history.

Pussycat 

Under the name of Sweet Reaction, the group sent a demotape with three songs on it to EMI Bovema and one of them was "Mississippi". This song was written by Werner for the girls in 1969 being inspired by the Bee Gees song 'Massachusetts' but was shelved by him for a reason Werner himself describes as the demise of country music in favor of rock and pop. When listening to the tape, it was "Mississippi" that grabbed EMI Bovema's attention, and they decided to sign the band. EMI's arranger Eddy Hilberts became their producer. With the sisters still the core members of the group, by early 1975 they recruited drummer Theo Coumans, bassist Theo Wetzels and guitarist John Theunissen to update their image once again now finally emerging as Pussycat.

Success of "Mississippi" 
'Mississippi' was Werner's first single released under the 'Pussycat' banner.  It was recorded in February 1975 in the EMI Bovema studios in Heemstede, Netherlands. The company was kind enough to postpone the recording sessions until after carnival, a festivity that is widely celebrated in the southern part of the Netherlands, to avoid the sisters having trouble with their voices as a result of celebrating carnival. 'Mississippi' was released in the Netherlands in the summer of 1975 backed with 'Do It' from the debut album by Pussycat. When Meta de Vries, a Dutch radio DJ played it on her radio show she received calls from various people inquiring about the song. Following this incident, they were invited to play the song in a Dutch TV quiz show hosted by Kick Stockhuyzen, as they had a question about the Mississippi River on the show and the broadcasting company thought it would be a nice idea to let Pussycat play 'Mississippi' right after the question. That's when things started to roll and by December 1975 the song became a massive hit seller at the Number One position in the Dutch charts, followed by the international success in 1976 pushing them into the charts across Europe and England as far as Africa and Australia, where it reached number one in August 1976. In South America alone, it even was charted for 129 weeks. 7 million copies were estimated to have been sold worldwide.

In the Netherlands, Pussycat was well sought after and Werner's songs yielded one hit after the other. During the following 10 years 6 hit albums and 17 singles, all of them almost equally successful. The follow-up of Werner's other hits after "Mississippi" were "Georgie" (1976) at No.4 in the Netherlands, and "Smile" (also in 1976) at No. 2. Both of these songs also charted in the United Kingdom. Some of his other well-known hits include "My Broken Souvenirs" (1977), "Wet Day in September" (1978) and "Doin'La Bamba" (1980).

Accolades 

Werner's panache in composing music and the band's own brilliant style of execution led the group 'Pussycat' to win several prestigious awards including the 'Conamus Award' (now called the Buma Export Award), 'Edison Award' and the German 'Löwe von Radio Luxemburg'. Pussycat won Conamus Export Award on 5 January 1977 from the Conamus Foundation. This award was bestowed upon them by the British Ambassador to the Netherlands, Sir John Barnes in The Hague for being the first Dutch pop group that had primarily taken on the British charts with their debut song 'Mississippi'.

Werner wrote several other hit songs for Pussycat albums. Some of them include "Same Old Song", "Tennage Queenie" and "Then The Music Stopped". Towards the end of 1984 the third line up of 'Pussycat' had disbanded and Werner with a repertoire of songs to his credit moved on to write songs for other artists.

Death 
Werner Theunissen continued to write songs until his death due to a cardiac arrest in a restaurant in England on 18 January 2010.
The last song he wrote for Toni Willé the former lead vocalist of Pussycat was 'Impressions'. In 2012 she dedicated this song to him.

The Entertainers – Discography 
 1965 Searching / Down Home Girl (Public-Records PR 651)
 1965 Searching / Down Home Girl (CNR UH 9778)
 1965 Searching / Down Home girl (Columbia C 23118) Duitsland
 1966 It's You / I'm Sorry Girl (CNR UH 9798)
 1966 Crazy Miss Daisy / Little Girl (CNR UH 9803)

Charts

Dutch Charts: Werner Theunissen (Pussycat) Singles

UK Charts : The Best Rated Songs from Werner Theunissen (Pussycat)

UK Charts: The Most Known Songs from Werner Theunissen

References

External links 
 Chart Information for 'Smile'
 German Charts Top 20 – Top 300
 Muziekencyclopedie – Werner Theunissen
 Toni Willé Online
 45 Cat
 Pussycat Music at Loads A Music Juke Box
 Pussycat by Henk Bloebaum
 Sweet Reaction by Henk Bloebaum

1942 births
2010 deaths
Dutch songwriters
People from Brunssum
Pussycat (band)